Celal İbrahim (1884 – 21 March 1917) was an Ottoman footballer of Kurdish origin and one of the founders of Galatasaray. He was also known as Kürt Celal which translates in English as Kurdish Celal.

Career
İbrahim spent the entirety of his career with Galatasaray, his hometown club. He once scored 4 goals against Fenerbahçe in a single match on 12 February 1911.

Death
He was killed in action in the Defense of Baghdad, Iraq on 21 March 21, 1917.

Honours
Galatasaray
Istanbul Football League: 1908–09, 1909–10, 1910–11, 1914–15

References

1880s births
1917 deaths
Footballers from the Ottoman Empire
Galatasaray S.K. footballers
Sportspeople from Malatya
Galatasaray High School alumni
Association football defenders
Ottoman military personnel killed in World War I